Joaquín Domingo Sánchez (born 16 August 1917; died 27 February 1981) was a Spanish artistic and carom billiards player, who won multiple world and European championships. He won the Artistic Billiards World Championship on three occasions and the European Billiards Artistic Championship on a further three occasions. He ended his career at the age of 58 with a bronze medal at the 1975 World Cup in Belgium. In total, Domingo was able to win 32 medals at world and European championships, plus 67 Spanish titles.

References

1917 births
1981 deaths
Order of Civil Merit members
Spanish carom billiards players